Oh, Sleeper is an American metalcore band from Fort Worth, Texas that formed in 2006 with former members of Terminal. In over a decade's span, Oh, Sleeper has released four full-length albums, two EPs, and toured worldwide as an opening act. After independently releasing The Titan EP and traveling in the full Van's Warped Tour 2013, the band went on hiatus to allow clean vocalist and lead guitarist Shane Blay to join As I Lay Dying members in starting California-based metal band Wovenwar. The band's fourth full-length album, Bloodied / Unbowed, was released on July 12, 2019.

History 

Oh, Sleeper was founded in April 2006 after Ryan Conley, former member of the rock band Terminal, got together with former Evelynn and Between the Buried and Me guitarist Shane Blay and former Terminal bassist Lucas Starr (who was at the time with As Cities Burn). Eventually they found a vocalist in Micah Kinard, formerly of Keeping Lions, and began practicing. The four members experienced typical problems of a band start-up (no place to practice, no money and different schedules), but the biggest obstacle was finding the final member. Countless awkward auditions failed to fill the missing position, until long time friend and fellow Terminal member James Erwin was found. After his addition to the lineup, the band released an EP, The Armored March, through 1x1 music.

The band signed with Solid State Records in mid-2007. Their debut album, When I Am God, was released on October 23, 2007. On December 28, 2007, Oh, Sleeper performed at the Plano Center in Plano, Texas along with the briefly reunited Terminal. Oh, Sleeper also supported Demon Hunter on their tour, along with Living Sacrifice, Advent, and The Famine. The tour in support of Norma Jean was drummer Ryan Conley's last with the band. Conley was replaced the following year by Matt Davis.

Son of the Morning was released on August 25, 2009. In an interview, Kinard stated that with this album, they wanted to combine crowd favorites such as "Vices Like Vipers" and "Charlatan's Host" from the previous album in order to make Son of the Morning stay true to their sound and please the fans. The lyrics on this album are much more straightforward than on their debut wherein Son of the Morning is a concept album based on the final battle between the Devil and God. The first single from the record was the title track, "Son of the Morning" and later in the year, Oh, Sleeper played the entire album for the first time in Waco Texas at Art Ambush. The cover of Son of the Morning is known as a "broken pentagram", which has to be distinguished from the broken pentagram used by black magicians with only one triangle left. The symbol was designed by Ryan Clark of Demon Hunter and it follows the same pattern as a pentagram with the horns missing. The album debuted on the Billboard 200 at No. 120 and also charted at No. 46 on the Rock Albums chart, at No. 7 on the Christian Albums chart and at No. 12 on the Hard Rock Albums chart.

On February 23, 2011, Lucas Starr announced his departure from the band. He was replaced by Nate Grady who had filled in on tour the year before.

The first single from Children of Fire, "Endseekers", was released on August 2, 2011, while "Hush Yael" was uploaded to their Facebook page on August 23. The album itself was released digitally on September 6, 2011, and physically in stores on September 27. James Erwin explained in an interview that the new album takes place after Son of the Morning and followed the life of a priest and his atheist daughter. The album is a spin on the rapture and explored how people would react in end times. At the beginning of the record, the priest takes the role of judge now that he thinks God is dead and follows the daughter's path of finding God throughout the record.

In November 2012, rhythm guitarist James Erwin announced his departure from the band. It was subsequently announced that Nate Grady would switch from bass to rhythm guitar to take Erwin's position in the band. The band announced that Johno Erickson (formerly of Sky Eats Airplane) would fill-in on bass while touring with Fit for a King and in Directions as well as playing several other shows and festivals. Erickson's position was later made permanent.

On April 24, 2013, the band announced they had completed their contract with Solid State Records and were going to record an independent EP via an Indiegogo fund-raiser. On May 24, 2013, their goal of $30,000 was reached. By the end of the fund-raiser the band had raised $54,577 and announced they would be able to record a second EP later the same year using the additional funds. The Titan EP was released July 2, 2013, and is just under 20 minutes long. The album's concept is about a campaign (The Titan) that has taken over the world offering artificial upgrades to a person's body and mind for a service contract (time-debt). The debts accumulate and are passed to one's family upon death.

In 2014, after the sentencing of As I Lay Dying's vocalist Tim Lambesis, the remaining members of the band recruited Shane Blay to be the vocalist in their new band, Wovenwar, and have completed work on their self-titled debut album which was released in the summer via Metal Blade Records.

The band released a single, "Oxygen", and announced that they would be releasing an album, Bloodied/Unbowed, in mid-2017. After some time, on November 30, 2018, the single "Decimation & Burial" was released, which marked their return to Solid State Records. On May 17, 2019, a third single entitled "Fissure" was released, along with an official release date and pre-orders for the new album. On June 27, 2019, their fourth single entitled "The Island" premiered on Altpress.com, and released on all streaming platforms June 28.

Former bassist and founding member Lucas Starr died of colon cancer at the age of 34 on December 7, 2018, four months after his stage four cancer diagnosis.

Christianity 

Kinard spoke about the Christianity aspect of the band, saying that, "At the beginning of the band, we were definitely an outspoken Christian band; but as the years have gone by, we have gone through certain member changes. Not all of our members share the Christian view, they support us and our beliefs, but they don't necessarily engage in that same belief. I myself am a Christian, and when I write passionately from my heart, that view will still come out, which the band supports. We would be lying if we said we can still operate under the Christian umbrella, and say everything we do is characterized by a Christian motivation."

Members 

Current members
 Shane Blay – lead guitar, clean vocals (2006–present)
 Micah Kinard – lead vocals, programming (2006–present)
 Zac Mayfield – drums, percussion (2010–present)
 Seth Webster – bass (2018–present)

Former members
 Ryan Conley – drums (2006–2008)
 Lucas Starr – bass (2006–2011, died 2018)
 James Erwin – rhythm guitar (2006–2012)
 Matt Davis – drums (2008–2010)
 Johno Erickson – bass (2012–2016)
 Nate Grady – bass (2011–2012); rhythm guitar (2012–2016)

Timeline

Discography 

EPs
 The Armored March (2006, 1x1)
 The Titan (2013, independent)

Notes

References

External links 

 

American Christian metal musical groups
Metalcore musical groups from Texas
Christian rock groups from Texas
Heavy metal musical groups from Texas
Musical groups established in 2006
American musical trios
Musical quintets
Solid State Records artists